Donald Platt is a poet and professor of English at Purdue University in West Lafayette, Indiana. Recently, he was awarded a 2011 National Endowment for the Arts Fellowship for Poetry.

Bibliography

"History & Bikinis" has appeared in Shenandoah and The Best American Poetry 2000
"Two Poets Meet" has appeared in The Iowa Review and The Best American Poetry 2006

References

American male poets
Living people
Year of birth missing (living people)